Major General Jonathan James Cole,  (born 1967) is a retired senior British Army officer, who served as the Director of Information at Army Command from 2018 to 2021.

Military career
Cole was commissioned into the Royal Signals on 8 August 1987. He was appointed an Officer of the Order of the British Empire in the 2008 New Year Honours. He served as commander of the 11th Signal Brigade from 2011 to 2013, and went on to become Director of Information at Army Command in 2018.

Cole was appointed Companion of the Order of the Bath (CB) in the 2022 New Year Honours.

References

External links
Project THEIA – digital transformation of the British Army
BAE Systems conversation with Cole

Living people
British Army major generals
Companions of the Order of the Bath
Officers of the Order of the British Empire
Royal Corps of Signals officers
1967 births